The United States Senate Committee on Energy and Natural Resources is a standing committee of the United States Senate. It has jurisdiction over matters related to energy and mineral resources, including nuclear development; irrigation and reclamation, territorial possessions of the United States, trust lands appertaining to America's indigenous peoples, and the conservation, use, and disposition of federal lands. Its roots go back to the Committee on Interior and Insulars Affairs. In 1977, it became the Committee on Energy and Natural Resources, and most matters regarding Native Americans, Alaska Natives, and Native Hawaiians were removed from its jurisdiction and transferred to the Committee on Indian Affairs.

History
The Committee on Public Lands was created in 1816 during the 14th Congress chaired by senator Jeremiah Morrow. In its early years, it managed the settlement of the recently purchased Missouri Territory. Over time, the committee oversaw the  western expansion of the United States, including the Texas annexation, the Oregon Treaty, the Mexican Cession, and the Gadsden Purchase. The Homestead Act of 1860, which would have benefited western settlers and migrants, was a result of jurisdiction of the Public Lands Committee.

In 1849, the Department of the Interior was established, with the Public Lands Committee serving as legislative oversight. The committee became responsible for enacting legislation to conserve nature and its resources. Due to the actions of the committee, Congress began working towards preservation of forests, wilderness, and historical landmarks with the signing of the Antiquities Act in 1906 and the establishment of the National Park Service in 1916.

The committee has gone under a number of name changes, but the functions and policy have remained similar to its creation. In 1921, the committee merged with the Committee on Geological Surveys to become the Committee of Public Lands and Surveys. Following the Legislative Reorganization Act of 1946, it became the Committee on Interior and Insular Affairs, absorbing the jurisdiction of the Indian Affairs, Territorial and Insular Affairs, Mines and Mining, and Irrigation and Reclamation committees. Its most recent iteration, the Committee on Energy and Natural Resources, was established on February 4, 1977, after the Committee System Reorganization Amendments of 1977.

Legislation

Current Year

See also:    

Senator Roger Marshall introduced a bill on March 1, 2022, banning US imports of Russian oil, supported by the GOP minority leader of the Senate Committee on Energy and Natural Resources and seven other Republicans.  The first move by a Western nation to impose a flat blockade on Russian petroleum, its top moneymaker, came a day prior from Canada. Prime Minister Justin Trudeau said that it "sends a powerful message."

Notable Past Legislation

Jurisdiction
In accordance of Rule XXV of the United States Senate, all proposed legislation, messages, petitions, memorials, and other matters relating to the following subjects is referred to the Senate Committee on Energy and Natural Resources:
 Coal production, distribution, and utilization;
 Energy policy;
 Energy regulation and conservation;
 Energy related aspects of deepwater ports;
 Energy research and development;
 Extraction of minerals from oceans and Outer Continental Shelf lands;
 Hydroelectric power, irrigation, and reclamation;
 Mining education and research;
 Mining, mineral lands, mining claims, and mineral conservation;
 National parks, recreation areas, wilderness areas, wild and scenic rivers, historical sites, military parks and battlefields, and on the public domain, preservation of prehistoric ruins and objects of interest;
 Naval petroleum reserves in Alaska;
 Nonmilitary development of nuclear energy;
 Oil and gas production and distribution;
 Public lands and forests, including farming and grazing thereon, and mineral extraction therefrom;
 Solar energy systems; and,
 Territorial possessions of the United States, including trusteeships.
The Committee is also charged to "study and review, on a comprehensive basis, matters relating to energy and resources development, and report thereon from time to time."

Members, 118th Congress

Chairpersons

Committee on Public Lands, 1816–1921
Jeremiah Morrow (R-OH) 1816–1819
Thomas Williams (R-MS) 1819–1820
Jesse Thomas (R-IL) 1820–1823
David Barton (NR-MO) 1823–1831
William R. King (D-AL) 1831–1832
Elias Kane (D-IL) 1832–1833
George Poindexter (W-MS) 1833–1835
Thomas Ewing (W-OH) 1835–1836
Robert Walker (D-MS) 1836–1841
Oliver Hampton Smith (W-IN) 1841–1843
William Woodbridge (W-MI) 1843–1845
Sidney Breese (D-IL) 1845–1849
Alpheus Felch (D-MI) 1849–1853
Solon Borland (D-AR) 1853
Augustus Dodge (D-IA) 1853–1855
Charles E. Stuart (D-MI) 1855–1859
Robert W. Johnson (D-AR) 1859–1861
James Harlan (R-IA) 1861–1865
Samuel Pomeroy (R-KS) 1865–1873
William Sprague (R-RI) 1873–1875
Richard Oglesby (R-IL) 1875–1879
Joseph E. McDonald (D-IN) 1879–1881
Preston Plumb (R-KS) 1881–1891
Joseph N. Dolph (R-OR) 1891–1893
James H. Berry (D-AR) 1893–1895
Fred T. Dubois (R-ID) 1895–1897
Henry C. Hansbrough (R-ND) 1897–1908
Knute Nelson (R-MN) 1908–1912
Reed Smoot (R-UT) 1912–1913
George E. Chamberlain (D-OR) 1913–1915
Henry L. Myers (D-MT) 1915–1919
Reed Smoot (R-UT) 1919–1921

Committee on Public Lands and Surveys, 1921–1947
Reed Smoot (R-UT) 1921–1923
Irvine L. Lenroot (R-WI) 1923–1924
Edwin F. Ladd (R-ND) 1924
Robert Nelson Stanfield (R-OR) 1924–1927
Gerald P. Nye (R-ND) 1927–1933
John B. Kendrick (D-WY) 1933
Robert F. Wagner (D-NY) 1933–1937
Alva B. Adams (D-CO) 1937–1941
Carl A. Hatch (D-NM) 1941–1947

Committee on Public Lands, 1947–1948
Hugh Butler (R-NE) 1947–1948

Committee on Interior and Insular Affairs, 1948–1977
Hugh Butler (R-NE) 1948–1949
Joseph C. O'Mahoney (D-WY) 1949–1953
Hugh Butler (R-NE) 1953–1954
Guy Cordon (R-OR) 1954–1955
James E. Murray (D-MT) 1955–1961
Clinton P. Anderson (D-NM) 1961–1963
Scoop Jackson (D-WA) 1963–1977

Committee on Energy and Natural Resources, 1977–present
Scoop Jackson (D-WA) 1977–1981
James McClure (R-ID) 1981–1987
Bennett Johnston (D-LA) 1987–1995
Frank Murkowski (R-AK) 1995–2001
Jeff Bingaman (D-NM) 2001
Frank Murkowski (R-AK) 2001
Jeff Bingaman (D-NM) 2001–2003
Pete Domenici (R-NM) 2003–2007
Jeff Bingaman (D-NM) 2007–2013
Ron Wyden (D-OR) 2013–2014
Mary Landrieu (D-LA) 2014–2015
Lisa Murkowski (R-AK) 2015–2021
Joe Manchin (D-WV) 2021–present

Historical committee rosters

117th Congress

Subcommittees

116th Congress

Subcommittees

115th Congress

Subcommittees

Source

See also
List of current United States Senate committees
The United States House Committee on Public Lands, was a predecessor of the United States House Committee on Resources

References

External links
 Official Committee Website (Archive)
 Senate Energy and Natural Resources Committee – Legislation activity and reports, Congress.gov

Energy
Energy in the United States
Environment of the United States
1816 establishments in Washington, D.C.
Organizations established in 1816